A shadow is a region of darkness where light is blocked.

Shadow or Shadows may also refer to:

Places
 Shadow, Virginia, an unincorporated community in the US

People
 M. Shadows (born 1981), lead singer for Avenged Sevenfold
Mary Shadow (1925–1992), American politician from Tennessee

Nickname or stage name
 Norvell Austin (born 1958) or Shadow, professional wrestler
 Lance Hoyt (born 1977) or Shadow, professional wrestler
 Jefferson King (born 1961) or Shadow, athlete from Gladiators
 DJ Shadow (born 1972), turntablist musician, producer, and songwriter
 Mighty Shadow (born 1941), Trinidad calypsonian
 The Shadow (rapper) (born 1977), Israeli hip hop artist
The Shadow, a professional wrestler from United States Wrestling Association
 Dorian Yates (born 1962) "The Shadow", former professional bodybuilder
 Black Shadow, Mexican professional Lucha Libre wrestler
 Shadoe Stevens (born 1947), American radio host, voiceover actor, and television personality

Arts, entertainment, and media

Fictional entities
 The Shadow, character from pulp fiction, radio and movies
 Shadow (Babylon 5), a race of extraterrestrials in the Babylon 5 universe
 Shadow (Dungeons & Dragons), an undead creature in Dungeons & Dragons
 Shadow (Final Fantasy), a player character in the 1994 role-playing video game Final Fantasy VI by Square
 Shadow, the main character in American Gods
 Shadow, a character in Homeward Bound: The Incredible Journey
 Shadow, a character in Bear in the Big Blue House
Shadow, a cybernetic and darkened version of Charlie Nash from Marvel Super Heroes vs. Street Fighter
 Shadow, a villain from the 1995s show Juukou B-Fighter
 Shadow, the most common form of the Heartless from Kingdom Hearts
 Shadow, the main character in Cyber Shadow
 Shadow and Gasher, a villain from the 1986 TV series Jikuu Senshi Spielban
 Shadow, also known as 'Blinky', one of the four antagonists in the video game Pac-Man. 
 Shadow Geist, a character from the game Street Fighter EX2
 Shadow Man, a ninja boss from the game Mega Man 3
 Shadow Master, a boss in Double Dragon V: The Shadow Falls
 Shadow the Hedgehog, an anti-hero from the Sonic the Hedgehog video game series
 Shadow Prove , a villain from anime series Bakugan: New Vestroia
 Shadow Weaver, a character from the cartoon She-Ra: Princess of Power
 The Master of Shadows, a ghost in an episode of The Real Ghostbusters
 The Shadow, the personification of Death in The Demonata
 The Shadow, a being dark controls the Empty, existed before God or the Darkness from the 2005 TV series Supernatural
 The Shadow, a nightmare entity breaking down reality from Amnesia: The Dark Descent
 Shadows, suppressed human thoughts given physical form, according to the Persona series

Films
 Shadows (1916 film), a film by B. Reeves Eason
 Shadows (1919 film), a film by Reginald Barker
 The Shadow (1920 film), an Italian silent film
 Shadows (1922 film), a film starring Lon Chaney, Sr.
 Shadows (1931 film), a British film
 The Shadow (1933 film), a film starring Felix Aylmer
 The Shadow (1937 film), a film starring Rita Hayworth
 The Shadow (serial), the ninth serial released by Columbia Pictures, in 1940
 The Shadow (1953 film), a Swedish film starring Eva Dahlbeck
 The Shadow (1954 film), a film starring Märta Torén
 Shadow (1956 film), a 1956 film by Jerzy Kawalerowicz
 Shadows (1959 film), a film by John Cassavetes
 The Shadow (1994 film), a film by Russell Mulcahy, starring Alec Baldwin, based on the pulp magazine/radio character
 Webmaster (film), a 1998 film also known as The Shadow
 Shadows (2007 film), a film by Milčo Mančevski
 Shadow (2009 Hindi film), a film starring Nasser Khan
 Shadow (2009 Italian film), a horror film directed by Federico Zampaglione
 Shadow (2013 film), a Telugu film by Meher Ramesh
 Shadow (2018 film), a Chinese film by Zhang Yimou
 Shadows (2020 film), an Italian thriller film by Carlo Lavagna
 The Shadow (unreleased film), a Russian film by Dmitriy Svetozarov, originally scheduled for release in 2017

Games
 The Shadow (pinball), a 1994 pinball game based on the 1994 film
 The Shadow (video game), a cancelled game based on the 1994 film
 Shadow the Hedgehog (video game), a video game based on the 2005 from the Sonic the Hedgehog series

Literature
 Book of Shadows, a book containing instructions for magical rituals
 The Shadow, the pulp fiction series from 1930s on (also a radio show and movie serials)
 The Shadow (magazine), the magazine in which the pulp fiction character appeared
 Shadow (Woodward book), a 1999 book by Bob Woodward
 Shadow (Star Trek), a 2001 Star Trek novel
 Shadow (Brown book), a 1982 book that won a Caldecott Medal for illustrator Marcia Brown
 Shadows (anthology), a series of horror anthologies
 Shadows (novel), a 1999 novel by Tim Bowler
 The Shadow (fairy tale), an 1847 fairy tale by Hans Christian Andersen

Music

Groups
 Shadow (group), a late '70s funk and soul group, a spin-off from The Ohio Players
 The Shadows (Nepalese band), a rock band from Nepal
 The Shadows, a British guitar-based instrumental group who were also accompanists for Cliff Richard

Albums
 Shadows (Gordon Lightfoot album), 1982
 Shadows (David Benoit album), 1991
 Shadows (Gary Bartz album), 1992
 Shadows (Creepmime album), 1993
 Shadows (Spy Glass Blue album), 1996
 Shadows (Wagon Christ album), 2004
 Shadows (Lynch album), 2009
 Shadows (Teenage Fanclub album), 2010
 Shadows (In the Midst of Lions album), 2011
 Shadows (Lenka album), 2013
 Shadows (Rachael Leahcar album), 2017
 The Shadow (album), a 1990 album by Ketil Bjørnstad
 The Shadow, the second album of rock band Naked Giants
 The Shadows (album), a 1961 album by The Shadows

Songs
 "Shadow" (Ashlee Simpson song), 2004
 "Shadow" (f(x) song), 2013
 "Shadow" (Alexandra Burke song), 2018
 "Shadows" (Sunny Day Real Estate song)
 "Shadows" (The Getaway Plan song)
 "Shadows" (Breed 77 song), 2005
 "Shadows" (Warpaint song), 2011
 "Shadows", by A. J. McLean from Have It All
 "Shadows", by The Afters from Live On Forever
 "Shadow", by Austin Mahone from The Secret
 "Shadow", by Bleachers from Strange Desire
 "Shadows", by Breathe Carolina from Savages
 "Shadow", by Britney Spears from In the Zone
 "Shadow", by Chromatics from Twin Peaks: Music from the Limited Event Series
 "Shadows", by Deep Purple from Shades of Deep Purple
 "Shadows", by Dev from The Night the Sun Came Up
 "The Shadow", by Devo from Total Devo
 "Shadows", by Eric Prydz
 "Shadows", by God Is an Astronaut from their self-titled album
 "Shadows", by Joe Walsh from You Bought It – You Name It
 "Shadow", by Kesha from High Road
 "Shadows", by Lindsey Stirling
 "Shadow", by Neurosis from Given to the Rising
 "Shadows", by New Trolls
 "Shadows", by Nidji from Top Up
 "The Shadow", by The Prodigy
 "Shadows", by Red from Innocence & Instinct
 "Shadows", by Red Fang from Only Ghosts
 "Shadows", by Red House Painters from Ocean Beach
 "Shadows", by Renegade Five
 "Shadows", by Rufus Wainwright from Poses
 "Shadow", by Ryan Adams from the self-titled album
 "Shadows", by Sabrina Carpenter from Evolution
 "The Shadow", by Timothy B. Schmit from Feed the Fire
 "Shadow", by Twice from More & More
 "Shadows", by Westlife from Where We Are
 "Shadows", by Wire from Mind Hive

Venues 
 The Shadows in Washington DC, a renowned music club also known as The Cellar Door from 1964 to 1981

Other
 Shadows (Sallinen), an orchestral prelude by Aulis Sallinen
The Shadow (underground newspaper), New York City, NY

Radio and television
 Shadow, a television ident for BBC Two, from the 1991–2001 series
 Shadows (TV series), a 1970s British supernatural television drama series aimed at older children
 Shadow (TV series), a 2019 South African television drama

Episodes
 "Shadow" (Buffy the Vampire Slayer), an episode of the television series Buffy the Vampire Slayer
 "Shadow" (Supernatural), an episode of the television series Supernatural
 "Shadows" (Agents of S.H.I.E.L.D.), an episode of the television series Agents of S.H.I.E.L.D.
 "Shadows" (The X-Files), an episode of the television series The X-Files
 "Shadows" (Voltron: Legendary Defender), an episode of the television series Voltron: Legendary Defender
 "Shadow," an episode of the television series Blake's 7
 "Shadows", an episode of Highlander
 "Shadows", an episode of the television series Teletubbies

Science and technology
 Shadow (mathematics), a concept in the theory of hyperreal numbers
 Shadow (OS/2), an OS/2 file linking strategy
 Shadows (software), a software package for designing sundials and astrolabes
 Acoustic shadow, acoustical phenomenon caused by an object placed in front of a source of sound
 Shadow memory, a technique used to track and store information on computer memory used by a program during its execution
 Shadow paging, a technique for providing atomicity and durability in database systems
 Shadow password (Unix' /etc/shadow)
 Shadow tables, objects in computer science used to improve the way machines, networks and programs handle information
 The Shadow, a Spirit DataCine without a Kodak front-end optics and CCD

Sports
 Shadow Racing Cars, former Formula One and CanAm racing team of Don Nichols and Jackie Oliver
 The Shadows, a former professional wrestling tag-team

Transport
 Shadow (motorbike), a Honda motorcycle
 AAI RQ-7 Shadow, an unmanned aerial vehicle (UAV) used by the United States Army
 Back Bone Shadow, a French paramotor design
 Dodge Shadow, a Chrysler Corporation automobile
 Vortech Shadow, an American autogyro rotorcraft design

Other uses
 Shadow (psychology), a part of the unconscious mind consisting of repressed personality traits
 Job shadow, an educational temporary work experience following someone else in their workplace
 Shadow Cabinet, members of the parliamentary opposition party
 USS Shadow III (SP-102), a United States Navy patrol boat in commission from 1917 to 1919
 Shadow Inc., a technology company that gained attention after their IowaReporterApp software failed during the 2020 Iowa Democratic caucuses
 Shadow.tech, a cloud computing service

See also
 Shadda, an Arabic diacritic mark
 Shado (disambiguation)
 Shadow Lake (disambiguation)
 Shadowing (disambiguation)
 Shadowman (disambiguation)
 Shatto (disambiguation)